Phobia is the twenty-fourth and final studio album by the English rock group the Kinks, released in 1993. It was their final studio album before their disbandment three years later and stands as their most recent album to date. It is also the only studio album credited to the Kinks which does not feature drummer Mick Avory in any capacity; though he left the band in 1984, he still played on individual songs on both Think Visual and UK Jive. The album was produced by Ray Davies himself as R. Douglas Davies.

Reception
The album received mixed reviews upon release. AllMusic gave it two out of five stars stating that "Ray Davies continues to turn out three or four brilliant songs on albums that barely anyone will ever hear." Rolling Stone
were more forgiving giving the album four out of five stars stating that "Phobia is prime late-model Kinks."

Track listing

Personnel
The Kinks
Ray Davies – guitar, keyboards, vocals
Dave Davies – guitar, vocals on "It's Alright (Don't Think About It)", "Hatred" and "Close to the Wire"
Jim Rodford – bass, backing vocals
Bob Henrit – drums

Technical
R. Douglas Davies– producer
Kevin Paul, Stan Loubières – engineer
Richard Edwards – recording
Bob Clearmountain, John Rollo – mixing
Christopher Austopchuk, Nicky Lindeman – art direction
Sue Coe – illustration

References

1993 albums
The Kinks albums
Columbia Records albums
Albums produced by Ray Davies